Santiago Rosales (born 22 March 1995) is an Argentine footballer who plays for Mitre on loan from Racing Club as a left winger.

References

External links

1995 births
Living people
Association football midfielders
Argentine footballers
Argentine expatriate footballers
Aldosivi footballers
Racing Club de Avellaneda footballers
Club Olimpia footballers
Club de Gimnasia y Esgrima La Plata footballers
Club Atlético Patronato footballers
Central Córdoba de Santiago del Estero footballers
Club Atlético Mitre footballers
Primera Nacional players
Argentine Primera División players
Paraguayan Primera División players
Argentine expatriate sportspeople in Paraguay
Expatriate footballers in Paraguay
Sportspeople from Mar del Plata